is a railway station in the city of Nagaoka, Niigata, Japan, operated by East Japan Railway Company (JR East).

Lines

Station layout
The station consists of one ground-level side platform serving a single bi-directional track. The station has a waiting room and toilet.

The station is unattended, and does not have ticket machines. Suica farecard cannot be used at this station.

History 
The station was elevated from a temporary stop on 25 September 1916. The station became part of the nationalised Echigo Line on 1 October 1927.  The cargo depot was closed on 1 February 1962.  A new station building was completed in December 1980. With the privatization of Japanese National Railways (JNR) on 1 April 1987, the station came under the control of JR East.

Surrounding area
 
Murata Myōhō-ji (Nichiren-sect temple)

See also
 List of railway stations in Japan

References

External links

 Station information 

Railway stations in Japan opened in 1916
Railway stations in Nagaoka, Niigata
Stations of East Japan Railway Company
Echigo Line